Bulevar (English: Boulevard) is an urban neighborhood of the city of Novi Sad, Serbia. Its name simply means "boulevard" in Serbian. Bulevar is not a traditional city neighborhood; it is rather an informal neighborhood that includes parts of several traditional city quarters that are situated around 3 km long Liberation Boulevard (Serbian: Bulevar oslobođenja), the main street in Novi Sad.

Location

Bulevar is situated between the city's train station and Liberty Bridge. It includes parts of the traditional neighborhoods of: Banatić, Sajmište, Grbavica, Rotkvarija, Stari grad, and Liman.

History

Liberation Boulevard was built in several phases, from 1962 until the late seventies. In that time, the new boulevard cut through the old housings establishing major communication lines. Until 1991, the name of the boulevard was Bulevar 23. oktobra (23 October Boulevard), in honour of October 23, 1944 when Novi Sad was liberated from Axis occupation. Today, every bus line in the city (except bus line 1) passes through Liberation Boulevard, making it the most important and busiest street in Novi Sad.

Features
Bulevar is also regarded as an informal city centre. Although most of the important political and cultural institutions are situated in the traditional city centre known as Stari grad, Bulevar is a main place in the city for business and leisure activities. Almost every bank in Serbia has its offices in Bulevar, while the headquarters of some important companies (for example Oil Industry of Serbia and Elektrovojvodina) are also located in this area. There are also many bars, shops, restaurants, and one market. Bulevar has a couple of recreational spots, including the Karađorđe Stadium and Liman Park.

Gallery

See also
 Neighborhoods of Novi Sad

References

 Jovan Mirosavljević, Brevijar ulica Novog Sada 1745-2001, Novi Sad, 2002.

External links
 Detailed map of Novi Sad and Liberation Boulevard
 Novi Sad bulevar images

Novi Sad neighborhoods
Populated places established in the 1960s
1960s establishments in Yugoslavia